Sex and Drugs and Jesus Christ is the sixth album by American deathrock band Christian Death. It was released on 18 October 1988.

Content

Album cover 

The cover artwork for Sex and Drugs and Jesus Christ has incited controversy. It depicts an image of Jesus Christ in a self-made tourniquet, injecting heroin.

According to Jungle Records' website, the artwork affected the band, leading to a cancellation of shows in Boston. The website claims the artwork was censored in NME and Melody Maker magazine, with the NME rating it a 1 out of 10, saying "may the good lord strike them down."

Release 

Released on 18 October 1988, Sex and Drugs and Jesus Christ is reportedly Christian Death's highest selling album from the 1980s.

Reception 

Trouser Press described the record as "awful", "rudimentary" and "barely musical".

Track listing
"This Is Heresy" - 4:21
"Jesus Where's the Sugar" - 3:14
"Wretched Mankind" - 4:24
"Tragedy" - 04:09
"Third Antichrist" - 10:21
"Erection" - 5:23
"Ten Thousand Hundred Times" - 4:42
"Incendiary Lover" - 3:01
"Window Pain" - 9:15

CD version contains the additional song "Tragedy" as track 4.

Personnel
Valor Kand - vocals, guitar, violin, piano
Gitane Demone - vocals, keyboards
Kota - bass
Webz - drums

References

1988 albums
Christian Death albums
Obscenity controversies in music